Sadarpur is a  village in Nawabganj of Bareilly district, in Uttar Pradesh, India.

References

Villages in Bareilly district